Yōji, Yoji, Youji, or Yohji is a common masculine Japanese given name

Possible writings
Yōji can be written using different kanji characters and can mean:

洋二, "ocean, second"
洋次, "ocean, next"
洋司, "ocean, rule"
洋治, "ocean, govern"
陽二, "sunshine, second"
陽次, "sunshine, next"
陽司, "sunshine, rule"
陽治, "sunshine, govern"

The name can also be written in hiragana ようじ or katakana ヨウジ.

People
with the given name Yōji
Yoji Akao (赤尾 洋二, born 1928), Japanese planning specialist
Yoji Anjo (安生 洋二, born 1967), Japanese professional wrestler and mixed martial arts fighter
Yoji (DJ), a Japanese trance/hard trance DJ
Yoji Enokido (榎戸 洋司, born 1963), Japanese screenwriter and voice actor
Yoji Mizuguchi (水口 洋次, born 1944), Japanese football player and manager
Yoji Muto (武藤 容治, born 1955), Japanese politician
, Japanese playwright
, Japanese footballer
Yoji Shinkawa (新川 洋司, born 1971), Japanese illustrator and conceptual artist
Yoji Totsuka (戸塚 洋二, 1942–2008), Japanese physicist
Yoji Ueda (上田 燿司, born 1971), Japanese voice actor
Yoji Yamada (山田 洋次, born 1931), Japanese film director

Fictional characters
Yoji Kudou (工藤 耀爾), a character in the anime series Weiß Kreuz
Yoji Kuramoto (倉元 洋二), a character in Battle Royale
Yoji/Yo-Yoji (alias, not known true name), a character from The Secret Series, friend of Cass and Max-Ernest.

Japanese masculine given names